Hôpital Paul-Brousse is a hospital in Villejuif, Val-de-Marne, France. It is named after Paul Brousse, a French socialist.

Marc Zelter MD and Daniel Vittecoq MD were professors in this hospital.

References

Hospitals in Val-de-Marne
Hospitals with year of establishment missing
Villejuif